Chase R. Purdy (born November 11, 1999) is an American professional stock car racing driver. He competes full-time in the NASCAR Craftsman Truck Series, driving the No. 4 Chevrolet Silverado for Kyle Busch Motorsports.

He has competed for MDM Motorsports in the Truck and ARCA Racing Series, David Gilliland Racing in the NASCAR K&N Pro Series East, and Anthony Campi Racing in super late model racing. Purdy was named to the 2017–2018 and 2018–2019 NASCAR Next classes.

Racing career

Advancing up the ladder like many racers do, Purdy first raced in go-karts, noting a memorable winning experience across the way from Talladega Superspeedway when he was young. He later moved to Bandolero cars, Legend cars, Late Model Stock cars and super late model cars, teaming up with former NASCAR driver David Gilliland and his team in SLMs.

Purdy is a former NASCAR Whelen All-American Series national rookie of the year. He finished fourth in his debut NASCAR K&N Pro Series East season in 2017. Purdy began driving full-time in the ARCA Racing Series in 2018. Purdy finished fourth in the season-long points tally, but did not break into Victory Lane. He also raced ten Super Late model events that year, including traveling across the United States to finish sixth in the Slinger Nationals at Slinger Super Speedway in Wisconsin. Purdy raced in his first ARCA Midwest Tour race at Wisconsin International Raceway and won the Dixieland 250 in his first appearance at the D-shaped 1/2 mile track. In summer 2018, Purdy's backers told him that they would not return for 2019, leaving his racing career in limbo. In his final late model race of 2018, Purdy won the Snowflake 100 at Five Flags Speedway.

On October 17, 2018, it was announced that Purdy would make his NASCAR Camping World Truck Series debut at Martinsville, driving the No. 99 truck for MDM Motorsports. He started 27th and finished 21st, and raced again in the Truck Series two weeks later at ISM Raceway, where he started 19th and finished 13th. He returned to the series in 2020, joining GMS Racing for a seven-race schedule in the No. 24 at Pocono Raceway, Kentucky Speedway, both Kansas Speedway events, Las Vegas Motor Speedway, Talladega Superspeedway, and Texas Motor Speedway.

In 2021, Purdy became a full-time driver for GMS in the Truck Series, replacing Brett Moffitt in the team's No. 23 truck.

On October 1, 2021, GMS announced that Grant Enfinger would drive the No. 23 truck full-time in 2022. Purdy moved to Hattori Racing Enterprises and the No. 61 truck.

Purdy will move to Kyle Busch Motorsports in 2023 driving the No. 4 Chevrolet.

Personal life

Purdy was born in Tuscaloosa, Alabama but raised in Meridian, Mississippi. He attended Lamar School and Cox Mill High School. He currently attends the University of Mississippi as a Junior and is a member of the Phi Delta Theta Fraternity.

Motorsports career results

NASCAR
(key) (Bold – Pole position awarded by qualifying time. Italics – Pole position earned by points standings or practice time. * – Most laps led. ** – All laps led.)

Craftsman Truck Series

 Season still in progress
 Ineligible for series points

K&N Pro Series East

ARCA Racing Series
(key) (Bold – Pole position awarded by qualifying time. Italics – Pole position earned by points standings or practice time. * – Most laps led.)

References

External links
 Official profile at Kyle Busch Motorsports
 

1999 births
Living people
NASCAR drivers
ARCA Menards Series drivers
Racing drivers from Mississippi
Sportspeople from Tuscaloosa, Alabama
Racing drivers from Alabama
Sportspeople from Meridian, Mississippi
ARCA Midwest Tour drivers